A shoe rack is a furniture which is often found by the door mat in the entryway of houses, and serves a function to keep shoes organized. Often it is placed near a hat shelf, a hatstand, wardrobe rail, or hook rack where clothes for outdoor use can be hung. Some shoe racks also serve as a bench where persons may sit while taking on their shoes.

A well known designer of shoe racks was Gunnar Bolin from Sweden. IKEA has sold shoe racks since at least 1950.

See also 
 Shoe hanger

References 

Cabinets (furniture)
Furniture